The 2008–2010 European Nations Cup (ENC) Third Division (a European rugby union competition for national teams) was contested over two years during which all teams met each other home and away.  The Third Division consisted of four levels, which effectively constituted the 5th through 8th levels of European international rugby. The winner of each division was promoted to the next highest division.  Due to changes in the competition, the last placed team was not be relegated to the next division lower.

The leader of each division (excluding 3D) at the end of the 2008–2009 season received the opportunity to participate in the qualification for the 2011 Rugby World Cup.

The previous champion of Division 3A, Sweden, was promoted to the Second Division and replaced with relegated side Andorra.

Table – Division 3A

Serbia were ranked ahead of Andorra based on 39–28 aggregate score in their two matches as the series was tied 1–1.

Matches

1 Armenia were unable to show up for the match due to a pilot's strike in Armenia; Lithuania were awarded a 25–0 victory and Armenia received a point for the loss. 
2 The match was originally scheduled for 17 April 2010, but was postponed due to the Eyjafjallajökull eruption. 
3 Lithuania's win in this match set a new world record in men's International Rugby for the most consecutive wins with 18 wins.

Table – Division 3B

Matches

Table – Division 3C

Greece were ranked ahead of Bulgaria based on 56–36 aggregate score in two head to head matches as the series was drawn 1–1.

Matches

Table – Division 3D

On 23 September 2009, Slovakia withdrew from the remainder of the competition, and their record was expunged.

Matches

1 Monaco forfeited the match due to player illness; Azerbaijan received a 6–0 win, and Monaco were given a point for the loss.

See also
 European Nations Cup
 2008-2010 European Nations Cup First Division
 2008-2010 European Nations Cup Second Division

2008-10
2008–09 in European rugby union
2009–10 in European rugby union
European Nations Cup Third Division
Euro
European Nations Cup Third Division

fr:Championnat Européen des Nations (rugby) 2008-2010
it:Campionato europeo per Nazioni di rugby 2008-2010
ka:ევროპის ერთა თასის მესამე დივიზიონი 2008-2010